Four Mothers  may refer to:

Four Mothers, 1941 movie
Four Mothers (Anti-war protest movement), Israeli antiwar protest movement
Four Mothers (Judaism), a term in reference to the Biblical matriarchs Sarah, Rebecca, Leah, and Rachel
Four Mothers Society, Native American religious and political movement